Khoravand (also Romanized as Khorāvand and Kharāvand; also known as Khowrāvand and Khvorāvand) is a village in Salehan Rural District, in the Central District of Khomeyn County, Markazi Province, Iran. At the 2006 census, its population was 552, in 162 families.

References 

Populated places in Khomeyn County